Sinutropis is a genus of fossil sea snails, extinct euomphalid archaeogastropods from the Upper Silurian.

Description

The shell has rounded whorls and a deep rounded sinus on the upper lip of the aperture in place of the typical exhalent angulation of most related genera. Otherwise the shell is not obviously ornamented.

Species
According to the Paleobiology Database, the following species are included in this genus:  
 Sinutropis esthetica Perner, 1903
 Sinutropis interrumpens Perner, 1903
 Sinutropis spiralis Rohr, 1988
 Sinutropis tenera Perner, 1903

References

Further reading 
 Brooks Knight J. et al (1960). Systematic Descriptions. Treatise on Invertebrate Paleontology Part I Mollusca 1. Geological Society of America and University of Kansas Press.
 D. M. Rohr D. M. (1988). "Upper Ordovician gastropods from the Seward Peninsula, Alaska". Journal of Paleontology 62(4): 551–566. JSTOR.

Euomphalidae
Paleozoic life of Manitoba
Silurian gastropods